Marshalls is a chain of US department stores.

Marshalls may also refer to:

 Marshall Islands
 Marshalls plc, construction materials company
 Marshalls (house)
 Marshall Aerospace and Defence Group, a British aircraft maintenance, modification and design company formerly known as Marshall's of Cambridge

See also 
 Marshal
 Marshal (disambiguation)
 Marshall (disambiguation)